Lanjaghbyur is a village in the Gavar Municipality of the Gegharkunik Province of Armenia.

History 
The village was founded in 1828.

Gallery

References

External links 

 
 
 

Populated places in Gegharkunik Province
Populated places established in 1828